Princess Maria Carolina Giuseppina Ferdinanda of Bourbon-Two Sicilies, full Italian name: Maria Carolina Giuseppina Ferdinanda di Borbone, Principessa delle Due Sicilie (21 February 1856, Naples, Kingdom of the Two Sicilies – 7 April 1941, Warsaw, Greater German Reich) was a member of the House of Bourbon-Two Sicilies and a Princess of Bourbon-Two Sicilies by birth and Countess Zamoyska through her marriage to Polish nobleman Count Andrzej Przemysław Zamoyski.

Family
Maria Carolina was the fourth child and third-eldest daughter of Prince Francis of Bourbon-Two Sicilies, Count of Trapani and his wife Archduchess Maria Isabella of Austria, Princess of Tuscany.

Marriage and issue
Maria Carolina married Andrzej Przemysław Zamoyski, son of Count Stanisław Kostka Andrzej Zamoyski and his wife, Rosa Maria Eva Potocka, on 19 November 1885 in Paris, France. Maria Carolina and Andrzej had seven children:

 Countess Marie Josepha Zamoyska (23 May 1887 – 17 February 1961)
 Count Franz Joseph Zamoyski (1888–1948)
 Count Stanislaus Zamoyski (1889–1913)
 Countess Marie Isabelle Zamoyska (1891–1957)
 Countess Marie Therese Zamoyska (1894–1953)
 Countess Marie Karoline Zamoyska (22 September 1896 – 9 May 1968); married her cousin Prince Ranieri, Duke of Castro.
 Count Jan Kanty Zamoyski (17 August 1900 – 28 September 1961) married Princess Isabel Alfonsa of Bourbon-Two Sicilies (1904–1985), granddaughter of Alfonso XII of Spain.

Ancestry

Honours
 
  : 1174th Dame of the Order of Queen Maria Luisa - .

References

1856 births
1941 deaths
Princesses of Bourbon-Two Sicilies
19th-century Neapolitan people